The 1964 Sacramento State Hornets football team represented Sacramento State College—now known as California State University, Sacramento—as a member of the Far Western Conference (FWC) during the 1964 NCAA College Division football season. Led by fourth-year head coach Ray Clemons, Sacramento State compiled an overall record of 8–2–1 with a mark of 4–0–1 in conference play, winning the FWC title for the first time. For the season the team outscored its opponents 213 to 84 and had five shutout victories. The Hornets played home games at Charles C. Hughes Stadium in Sacramento, California.

At the end of the season, the Hornets were invited to play in the program's first bowl game, the Camellia Bowl, where Sacramento State was defeated by Montana State, 28–7, in the game played at the Hornets' home stadium.

Schedule

Notes

References

Sacramento State
Sacramento State Hornets football seasons
Northern California Athletic Conference football champion seasons
Sacramento State Hornets football